The Battle of Magenta was fought on 4 June 1859 during the Second Italian War of Independence, resulting in a French-Sardinian victory under Napoleon III against the Austrians under Marshal Ferencz Gyulai.

It took place near the town of Magenta in the Kingdom of Lombardy–Venetia, a crown land of the Austrian Empire, on 4 June 1859. Napoleon III's army crossed the Ticino River and outflanked the Austrian right forcing the Austrian army under Gyulai to retreat. The confined nature of the country, a vast spread of orchards cut up by streams and irrigation canals, precluded elaborate manoeuvre. The Austrians turned every house into a miniature fortress. The brunt of the fighting was borne by 5,000 grenadiers of the French Imperial Guard, still mostly in their First Empire style of uniforms. The battle of Magenta was not a particularly large battle, but it was a decisive victory for the Franco-Sardinian alliance. Patrice de MacMahon was created Duc de Magenta for his role in this battle, and would later go on to serve as President of the French Third Republic.

An overwhelming majority of the French-Piedmontese coalition soldiers were French (1,100 were Piedmontese and 58,000 were French).

Background
From 1 June through 3 June, the French and Piedmontese pursued the Austrian 2nd Army to the Ticino River, the border between Lombardy and Piedmont. The Austrians set up a defensive position at Magenta, utilizing the Naviglio Grande, which could be crossed only at four bridges. Gyulai had available 68,00 men, composed of the I,II, III and VII Korps. The French had about 50,000 men, while Manfredo Fanti added another 12,000. Camou had crossed the Ticino during the Battle of Turbigo, followed by MacMahon. MacMahon, Camou and Espinasse crossed the canal on bridges at Bernate Ticino and Boffalora sopra Ticino, placing them north of Magenta.

Battle
At noon, MacMahon encountered elements of Liechtenstein's II Korps. The Imperial Guard Corps made contact with the Austrians from Buffalora to Magenta. At 2pm, the Guard Zouaves crossed the canal with boats, establishing a bridgehead. Eduard Clam-Gallas informed Gyulai of the French attack, who sent Schwarzenberg's III Korps from Robecco sul Naviglio, threatening the French right flank. Canrobert arrived in time to reinforce the Guard.  From 3.30 through 5.30pm, MacMahon launched an attack against the Austrian I and II Korps. By 6.30pm the Austrians began a fighting withdrawal, while the French advanced into Magenta and beyond. By 10pm, the Austrian 2nd Army was withdrawing toward Abbiategrasso.

Aftermath
On 8 June, Napoleon III and Victor Emmanuel II entered Milan, followed by Brescia a few days later. On 23-25 May, Prince Napoléon Bonaparte's V Corps landed at Livorno, and then entered Florence a week later, followed by Parma, and Modena. According to Frederick Schneid, "The defeat at Magenta spelled the end for Gyulai. He withdrew his army to the Chiese River east of Milan, and resigned on June 16."

A dye producing the colour magenta was discovered in 1859, and was named after this battle, as was the Boulevard de Magenta in Paris.

References

Bibliography

June 1859 events
Magenta
Magenta 1859
Magenta
Magenta
Magenta 1859
Magenta 1859
1859 in the Austrian Empire
1859 in Italy
1859 in France